The 2010 Thomas & Uber Cup was the 26th tournament of the Thomas Cup and 23rd tournament of the Uber Cup, the most important and most prestigious badminton tournaments in men's and women's team competition, respectively. The 2010 championships marked the Thomas & Uber Cup's 10 year return to Malaysia which has always seen great fan interest in the sport.

The final rounds were held from May 9 to May 16 at Putra Indoor Stadium in Kuala Lumpur, Malaysia which was also the same venue of the 2000 Thomas & Uber Cup, when Indonesia get their 12th title in the Thomas Cup after defeat China by 3–0 in the final. But, Indonesia defeated by China, also by 0–3 in the final, to ensure the China's eighth title in the Thomas Cup, while Korea won the Uber Cup after defeat China with 3–1 score.

Host city selection
Badminton World Federation initially intended to split the Thomas and Uber Cup finals as separate tournaments. Malaysia was the only bidder for Thomas Cup finals, while China and South Korea were interested to host the Uber Cup finals. The plan to split the tournaments was eventually abandoned and Malaysia was asked to hold the Uber Cup final together.

Venue
Putra Indoor Stadium, Bukit Jalil, Kuala Lumpur

Qualification

Squads

Thomas Cup

Groups

Group A

Group B

Group C

Group D

Knockout stage

Uber Cup

Groups

Group A

Group B

Group C

Group D

Knockout stage

References

External links
Official website
European Men's & Women's Team Championships 2010 (Europe Preliminaries)
Thomas & Uber Cup Preliminaries (Oceania)
Thomas & Uber Cups Preliminaries for Africa
Thomas & Uber Cup 2010 Preliminary Asia Zone
TUC Regional 2010 (Pan Am)

 
Thomas & Uber Cup
2010 in badminton
2010 in Malaysian sport
Badminton tournaments in Malaysia
International sports competitions hosted by Malaysia
Sport in Kuala Lumpur